Alexis Daria is an American writer of romance novels. Her most well known book is You Had Me at Hola. Her 2018 debut novel Take the Lead received a RITA Award for "Best First Book".

The cover of You Had Me at Hola was designed by illustrator Bo Feng Lin.

Daria has a bachelor's degree in Computer Arts. She currently resides in New York City.

Bibliography

Novels
 Take the Lead (St. Martin's Press, 2018)
 You Had Me at Hola (Avon, 2020)
 A Lot Like Adios (HarperCollins, 2021)

Novellas
 Dance All Night

Short stories
 "Solstice Dream"
 "Solstice Miracle"

References

External links
 Official website

Living people
American romantic fiction novelists
People from New York City
Year of birth missing (living people)
American people of Puerto Rican descent